Adam's Rock (he: סלע אדם – Sela Adam; ar: حجر آدم) or Adam's Island (he: אי אדם – Ie Adam; ar: جزيرة آدم) is a tiny Israeli island about half a kilometer west of Bat Yam. A smaller rock (island) is located 10 m west of Adam Rock.

Geology and geomorphology 
Adam's Rock is a protrusion in an abrasion platform, a remnant of an ancient kurkar ridge. This ridge was unevenly destroyed in abrasion, a process of grinding and erosion.

History
The beach near the island is known as Rock Beach, after the tiny island opposite the beach. Until the breakwaters at the Rock Beach in Bat Yam were built in the late 1960s, the rock could only be reached swimming or sailing. Swimming there was and still is a common activity among bathers. 

The nature researcher and tour guide Yehuda Ziv wrote about the island: 

The legend and name were previously mentioned by Zev Vilnay, who dates these back to the Middle Ages.

References

External links
Adam's rock exhibition, MoBY

Islands of Israel
Bat Yam